10th Rifle Division can refer to:

10th Rifle Division (Soviet Union)
10th NKVD Rifle Division of the Soviet Union
10th Guards Motor Rifle Division of the Soviet Union
10th Siberian Rifle Division